Pier Martire or Pier Martino Armani (January 14, 1613 – July 10, 1699) was an Italian painter of the Baroque period. He was born and worked in Reggio.

He trained as a pupil of Leonello Spada and Sebastiano Vercellesi. He was one of the artists called to decorate the Basilica della Ghiara in Modena.

References

Sources

1613 births
1699 deaths
People from Reggio Emilia
17th-century Italian painters
Italian male painters
Painters from Modena
Italian Baroque painters